The Custos Rotulorum of Westmeath was the highest civil officer in County Westmeath. The position was later combined with that of Lord Lieutenant of Westmeath.

Incumbents

1662–?1672 Thomas Dillon, 4th Viscount Dillon
1728–1729 George Forbes, 3rd Earl of Granard
1765–1788 Thomas Nugent, 6th Earl of Westmeath
1788–1814 George Frederick Nugent, 7th Earl of Westmeath (died 1814)
<1819–?1835 Thomas Pakenham, 2nd Earl of Longford (died 1835)
–?1871 George Thomas John Nugent, 8th Earl of Westmeath (died 1871)

For later custodes rotulorum, see Lord Lieutenant of Westmeath

References

Westmeath